Michael Edward Gross (born June 21, 1947) is an American television, film, and stage actor. He is notable for playing Steven Keaton on the sitcom Family Ties (1982–89) and survivalist Burt Gummer in the Tremors film franchise, being the only actor to appear in all the films, show and a canceled pilot.

Early life
Gross was born in Chicago, the son of Virginia Ruth Gross, a telephone operator, and William Oscar Gross, a tool designer. Gross and his younger sister, Mary, were raised Catholic. He attended St. Francis Xavier  and St. Genevieve schools in Chicago in his early years, graduating from the latter in 1961.

He attended Kelvyn Park High School on the north side of Chicago, graduating in 1965. He received his drama degree at the University of Illinois at Chicago before attending Yale University for his Master of Fine Arts degree. His sister, Mary, a former Saturday Night Live cast member, is an actress. The siblings are first cousins to actor Ron Masak.

Career
Gross was first seen by a broad audience in his role as Steven Keaton in the 1980s sitcom Family Ties; he and his co-star Meredith Baxter, who played his wife Elyse Keaton, were born on the same day, June 21, 1947. However, his longest-running and highest-profile role has been Burt Gummer in the Tremors franchise, having played the role for thirty years from the release of the original Tremors in 1990 to Tremors: Shrieker Island in 2020. His performance in Tremors 3: Back to Perfection earned him a Best Actor award from the DVD Exclusive Awards, formerly known as the Video Premiere Awards.

Gross guest-starred in an episode of the sitcom Night Court, in which he played a sexual predator of Markie Post's character, Christine Sullivan. In 1988, he portrayed a murderous bank robber in the true life movie In the Line of Duty: The F.B.I. Murders. His other television credits include Boston Legal, How I Met Your Mother, Batman Beyond, ER, Parks and Recreation (Episode: "Summer Catalog"), Law & Order, and two of its spin-offs: SVU and Criminal Intent. From August 2008 to January 2009, Gross appeared on the CBS soap The Young and the Restless as River Baldwin. Gross appeared in 2000 on Spin City as a therapist to Michael J. Fox's character on Fox's final show as a regular on that program. In November 1979, Gross originated the role of Greta in the Broadway production of Martin Sherman's Bent.

Personal life
Gross has been married to casting director Elza Bergeron since June 2, 1984, and he is the stepfather to her two children.

Gross remains close friends with his Family Ties co-star Meredith Baxter.

Gross is a passionate railfan with an extensive collection of railroad antiques. He is an amateur railroad historian, photographer, modeler, and part-owner in a working railroad, the Santa Fe Southern Railway, a former branch line of the Atchison, Topeka and Santa Fe Railway which operates between Lamy and Santa Fe, New Mexico. He is also the spokesman for the World's Greatest Hobby campaign sponsored by the Model Railroad Industry Association that promotes the hobby of model railroading. He has also been a spokesperson for Operation Lifesaver, a campaign promoting safety at railroad grade crossings.

Since 2009, Gross has been the "celebrity spokesman" for the B&O Railroad Museum in Baltimore, Maryland. He is the host of the B&O Railroad Museum Television Network on YouTube. He is also a member of the Santa Fe Railway Historical Society.

Gross is a fan of the Chicago Cubs baseball team. After the Cubs won the 2016 World Series, Gross suggested his character Burt Gummer switch to a Cubs cap for Tremors: A Cold Day in Hell, replacing the Atlanta Hawks cap he had worn in the first five films of the series.

Filmography

Film

Television

References

External links

Michael Gross at Internet Off-Broadway Database

Male actors from Chicago
American male stage actors
American male voice actors
American male film actors
American male television actors
Drama Desk Award winners
Living people
University of Illinois Chicago alumni
Yale School of Drama alumni
1947 births
20th-century American male actors
21st-century American male actors